Yehezqiyah, also rendered in English as Hezekiah, was a governor of Judea - probably the last governor during the Persian period when the province was known as Yehud or Yehud Medinata, or possibly (also) during Ptolemaic rule at the beginning of the Hellenistic period in the region.

"Yehezqiyah the governor" coins
Yehezqiyah is identified as yhzqyh hphh, 'Yehezqiyah ha-pechah' ("Yehezqiyah the governor") by the inscription on a coin type dated to the late fourth century, possibly around 335 BCE, one of which was found at Beth Zur, and some specialists are arguing that the coin might also be of a slightly later date, from the time when Persian rule was replaced by the Ptolemaic. The inscription can also be rendered in English as "the governor Hezekiah".

See also
Governors of Yehud Medinata

References

4th-century BCE Jews
Satraps of the Achaemenid Empire